Big Sky is an unincorporated census-designated place (CDP) in Gallatin and Madison counties in southwestern Montana, United States. As of the 2010 census it had a population of 2,308. This unincorporated community straddles both counties, is not considered a town, and does not have a town government. The primary industry of the area is tourism.

Geography

The "Meadow" area of Big Sky lies in an alpine valley formed during the Cretaceous period. Initially called the "Gallatin Canyon Basin", the Meadow is braided with small rivers that channel mountain snow run-off. Fishing is permitted on all of these Gallatin feeders. Two ponds are found on the Middle Fork of the Gallatin River that bisects the Meadow, and fishing there is permitted for those 16 and younger. Since 1993, an innovative sewer system has protected the water in the area from sewage discharge. Several agencies, such as the Gallatin River Task Force, monitor the health of the rivers.

The community had two large ski resorts that are sited in the "Mountain" area: Big Sky Resort and Moonlight Basin. In October 2013, these resorts merged: both are now managed by Big Sky Resort, and both are alpine ski and golf resorts. The combined terrain of the two resorts allows them to market themselves as the "Biggest Skiing in America", with over 5,800 acres of terrain. The Spanish Peaks Mountain Club is an exclusive ski and golf resort that has three chairlifts and 13 ski runs connecting it to Big Sky Resort at the base of Big Sky's Southern Comfort lift. Spanish Peaks is also now owned by Big Sky Resort, in collaboration with the Yellowstone Club. Another resort, Lone Mountain Ranch, is a Nordic ski and summer resort that professionally grooms over 75 kilometers of cross-country ski trails. Yellowstone Club, a private resort, is located to the south and adjacent to Big Sky Resort.

The "Canyon" area of Big Sky lies in the Gallatin Canyon, along the Gallatin River, a favorite for white water rafters and kayakers. The Gallatin River, named after Albert Gallatin who was the Secretary of the Treasury during the Lewis and Clark Expedition, is a Blue Ribbon trout stream that attracts fly-fishers from around the world. Several dude ranches (320 Guest Ranch, Elkhorn Ranch, Cinnamon Lodge and 9 Quarter Circle) operate in the Gallatin Canyon.

Most of the CDP drains to the east into the Gallatin River, while the westernmost portions drain west via Cedar Creek and Jack Creek to the Madison River. The Gallatin and the Madison both drain north to the Missouri River.

Climate
This climatic region is typified by large seasonal temperature differences, with warm to hot summers and cold (sometimes severely cold) winters. According to the Köppen Climate Classification system, Big Sky has a borderline humid continental (Dfb) / alpine subarctic climate (Dfc). for most of the area, but the lower elevations may be closer to a dry continental climate.

Demographics

At the 2010 census, there were 2,308 people living in the CDP. The population density was 10.1 per square mile.

Activities

Hiking trails thread throughout the landscape and into neighboring national forests. Camping sites are available throughout the Spanish Peaks and the Gallatin National Forest. Elk, deer, black bears, grizzlies, upland birds, waterfowl, and wolves call this area home. Hunting is prohibited in Big Sky proper, but it is permitted throughout the National Forests that surround the area. Recreational snowmobiling is also not permitted within the Meadow or Mountain terrain, but is permitted in the Gallatin Canyon and in areas to the south of Big Sky.

Big Sky offers a variety of recreational venues. In addition to outdoor activities, the Lone Peak Cinema movie theater shows current blockbuster films. The Warren Miller Performing Arts Center, a community and school-based facility, is located at the school on US Highway 191. The venue attracts local, national, and international artists in every genre (music, drama, dance, visual arts, and creative composition). Known to locals as the WMPAC, the center is home to the Big Sky Community Chorus, the Big Sky Community Theater, and Big Sky Broadway, a children's musical theater company. During the summer, the Arts Council of Big Sky presents weekly free music concerts with musicians from across the nation at Center Stage in Town Center Park. Each August, the Arts Council holds a four-day classical music festival. A wide variety of music can be heard year-round at the resorts and local restaurants and bars. Several art galleries feature local and regional photography and other visual media.

For the history buff, the Historic Crail Ranch Buildings, built by Montana pioneer Frank Crail and his family, offer a glimpse of life in Big Sky more than 100 years ago. The authentic cabins are preserved as part of the Crail Ranch Homestead Museum. The museum displays artifacts, photographs and documents, along with extensive information about the pioneer Crail and Creek families.

In mid-summer, Big Sky hosts the Big Sky PBR (Professional Bull Riders) event. The Big Sky Farmers Market features live music, children's activities, and over 90 vendors selling fresh, locally grown food, and crafts each Wednesday during the summer months in Town Center's Fire Pit Park. In the winter months, Town Center Park hosts Big Sky's hockey and ice skating rink that is operated by the Big Sky Skating and Hockey Association.

Education
The area is served by a K-12 public school district, called the Big Sky School District #72, and a preK-6 non-profit private school, Big Sky Discovery Academy. There are three public schools: Ophir Elementary School, Ophir Middle School and Lone Peak High School. The district educates approximately 425 students.

Media
Big Sky has two local newspapers, Explore Big Sky, and "Lone Peak Lookout," in addition to the regional publication, Bozeman Chronicle.

The local radio station is KBZM. Other regional radio stations can be received from Bozeman.

Three television stations are available: KTVM (6) NBC, KBZK (7) CBS, and KUSM (9) PBS.

ExploreBigSky.com is a regional daily news website.

Notable people
 Jessica Biel, actress, and her husband, pop star Justin Timberlake, have a home at the Yellowstone Club
 Troy Downing, politician, technology entrepreneur 
 Robert Peter Gale, cancer researcher
 Chet Huntley, pioneering newscaster, retired to Big Sky and put together corporate resources for the financing of the Big Sky Resort
 Bode Miller, Former Olympian ski racer
 Warren Miller, film director, lived in Big Sky during the winter
 Matt Morris, former Major League Baseball pitcher with the St. Louis Cardinals, San Francisco Giants, and Pittsburgh Pirates
 Marty Pavelich, NHL player, year-round resident
 Jamie Pierre, professional skier, snowboarder

See also

 Soldiers Chapel

References

External links

 Visit Big Sky
 Biggest Skiing in America
 Big Sky Chamber of Commerce
 Big Sky Community Organization
 Crail Ranch Homestead Museum

Census-designated places in Gallatin County, Montana
Census-designated places in Madison County, Montana